Orsodacne humeralis is a species of beetle found in Eurasia.

Description 
O. humeralis is 4-7 mm long, similar in appearance to other species of the genus, having fairly long antennae with a slightly hairy body. The colour varies from black or dark blue to pale yellow.

Feeding 
Orsodacne humeralis feeds on nectar and pollen.

References 

Beetles of Europe
Beetles of Asia
Beetles described in 1804
Orsodacnidae